Divya Gopalan is a broadcast journalist, currently working for TaiwanPlus.

Gopalan worked for Al Jazeera English, CNN, NBC and CNBC in Hong Kong, first starting as a sports correspondent.  She became a newsreader on Hong Kong's television and then worked for the BBC, based in London.

Gopalan joined Al Jazeera English in 2006, in the run-up to the station's launch. She was one of the original news presenters at the former broadcast-centre in Kuala Lumpur in Malaysia. She is now an anchor at the main broadcast centre, in Doha in Qatar, where she is a presenter on Newshour. As well as news-reading, Gopalan hosts studio-based interview programmes, such as Inside Story and its weekly counterpart, Inside Syria. In addition, in 2013, Gopalan  worked as a field correspondent reporting from India and Tajikistan. She has previously reported from Japan, South Korea and China and, in the Middle East, from Egypt.

Gopalan's family is of Indian (Kerala) origin, but she was born in Hong Kong. She was also raised in the Philippines, with her two sisters then moved to Hong Kong afterwards.

She then moved to Canada for her education and later worked for five years in Europe, before taking up her post in the Middle East.

References

External links
Gopalan's profile on Al Jazeera 

Living people
Al Jazeera people
BBC newsreaders and journalists
CNN people
CNBC people
English people of Indian descent
Year of birth missing (living people)